Claude Debussy (1862–1918) was a French composer.

Debussy may also refer to:
 Debussy (crater), an impact crater on Mercury
 Debussy (horse), an Irish Thoroughbred racehorse
 4492 Debussy, a main-belt asteroid

See also
 De Bussy (disambiguation)
 Debussy Heights, a minor mountain range in Antarctica
 Hylarana debussyi, a species of frog